Sergey Usov (born 16 January 1964 in Tashkent) is a retired Belarusian athlete who specialised in the sprint hurdles. He competed at the 1992 Summer Olympics, reaching the semifinals, as well as two outdoor and two indoor World Championships.

His personal bests are 13.27 seconds in the 110 metres hurdles (+1.8 m/s, Leningrad 1988), which is also the current Uzbekistani national record, and 7.58 seconds in the 60 metres hurdles (Moscow 1991).

Competition record

References

1964 births
Living people
Sportspeople from Tashkent
Uzbekistani male hurdlers
Soviet male hurdlers
Belarusian male hurdlers
Olympic athletes of the Unified Team
Athletes (track and field) at the 1992 Summer Olympics
World Athletics Championships athletes for Belarus
World Athletics Championships athletes for the Soviet Union
CIS Athletics Championships winners
Competitors at the 1990 Goodwill Games